Siege: Trump Under Fire is a book by Michael Wolff and which according to Wolff, details the behavior of U.S. President Donald Trump and his administration. The book is a sequel to Fire and Fury: Inside the Trump White House, a New York Times number one bestseller.

Publication
In June 2018, Wolff announced that he had signed a deal with Henry Holt and Company, the publisher of Fire and Fury, to write a sequel. The book was released on June 4, 2019.

Summary
Wolff's narrative begins in February 2018, and ends with the release of the Mueller Report in March 2019. Wolff uses on-the-record comments by Steve Bannon, a former aide to Trump. He claims to have 150 sources for the book. According to Wolff, "Robert Mueller drew up a three-count obstruction of justice indictment against Donald Trump before deciding to shelve it." A week prior to the release of Siege, a spokesperson for Mueller denied that such a document exists.

Reception
Harvard law professor Alan Dershowitz, who was mentioned in the book, criticized Wolff and his publisher's alleged failure to confirm the story, adding that "it is fiction and bad fiction at that."

References

External links

2019 non-fiction books
American non-fiction books
Biographies about politicians
Unauthorized biographies
Books about American politicians
Books about the Trump administration
Books by Michael Wolff
English-language books
Henry Holt and Company books